Ghasem Amir Yavarkandi (5 December 1931 – 10 November 2020) also known as Amir Yavari, was a member of the Iranian senior national boxing team. Yavari joined the "Niroo va Rasti" (Power and Virtue) Club in 1947 at the age of sixteen, where he started his boxing career and became a member of "Jafari" Club later on, where he stayed until 1962 which was the end of his national boxing championship career.

Boxing career

Yavari, a member of Tehran's Jafari Club, boxing in the 67 and 71 kg divisions, was selected to train with the Iran national Boxing team  to participate at the 1948 Summer Olympics, for the first time, as a reserve boxer, making his national-team debut. He acted as team captain of the Iranian boxers at the 1958 Asian Games in the light-middleweight division.  Yavari won the silver medal in the 71 kg boxing division after losing on points to Osamu Takahashi from Japan in the final. Yavari was selected as Iranian captain during the 1960 Summer Olympics, where he competed in the welterweight division. Yavari was also selected in the light-middleweight division of the senior Iranian national boxing team for Jakarta, Indonesia, 1962 Asian Games, succeeding in Iran national championship matches held in Tehran, after defeating his opponents. After Iran National Olympic Committee (N.O.C.IRAN) decided not to participate in the games, with any sports team, mentioning lack of adequate national budget, Yavari retired from championship boxing and the Iranian national boxing team in 1962, passing on the national boxing team captaincy armband to Hassan Pakandam.

Personal
Yavari was born in Tehran, Iran, and lived in  "Mokhbereddoleh", Tehran, where he started his boxing career. He married in 1963 and had three sons from his marriage.

References

1931 births
2020 deaths
Sportspeople from Tehran
Olympic boxers of Iran
Boxers at the 1960 Summer Olympics
Asian Games medalists in boxing
Boxers at the 1958 Asian Games
Asian Games silver medalists for Iran
Iranian male boxers
Medalists at the 1958 Asian Games
Light-middleweight boxers